Grass Lake may refer to:

Canada
 Grass Lake (Haliburton County), Ontario
 Rural Municipality of Grass Lake No. 381, Saskatchewan

United States
 Grass Lake, Illinois, a community and lake in Lake County
 Grass Lake School District 36, Lake County, Illinois
 Grass Lake, Michigan, a village in Jackson County
 Grass Lake Charter Township, Michigan, in Jackson County
 Grass Lake Community Schools, Jackson County, Michigan
 Grass Lake High School, a high school in Grass Lake, Michigan
 Grass Lake (Kanabec County, Minnesota)
 Grass Lake, Minnesota, a community in Kanabec County
 Grass Lake Township, Kanabec County, Minnesota
 Grass Lake (New York), a lake in Jefferson County
 Grass Lake (Codington County, South Dakota)
 Grass Lake (Minnehaha County, South Dakota)
 Grass Lake Nature Park, a lake and nature preserve in Olympia, Washington

See also
 Grass Lake Township (disambiguation)
 Grassy Creek (disambiguation)
 Grassy Lake (disambiguation)